The women's kumite 53 kilograms competition at the 2002 Asian Games in Busan was held on 11 October at the Yangsan College Gymnasium.

Schedule
All times are Korea Standard Time (UTC+09:00)

Results

Main bracket

Repechage

References
2002 Asian Games Report, Page 483

External links
Official website

Women's kumite 53 kg